Federico Sicard (born 19 February 1950) is a Colombian former swimmer. He competed in four events at the 1968 Summer Olympics.

References

External links
 

1950 births
Living people
Colombian male swimmers
Olympic swimmers of Colombia
Swimmers at the 1968 Summer Olympics
Sportspeople from Cali